Yordan Ruben Álvarez (born June 27, 1997) is a Cuban professional baseball designated hitter and left fielder for the Houston Astros of Major League Baseball (MLB).  He made his MLB debut in 2019 for the Astros. Nicknamed "Air Yordan", Álvarez stands , weighs , bats left-handed and throws right-handed.

Prior to his American career, Álvarez played two seasons in the Cuban National Series for Las Tunas.  He defected from Cuba in 2016 to establish residency in Haiti, where he first signed with the Los Angeles Dodgers as an international free agent.  Houston acquired him via trade from the Dodgers in 2016 before he made his professional debut. In 2019, he was unanimously named American League (AL) Rookie of the Year after posting the highest slugging percentage (.655) by a qualified rookie in history.

After missing all but two games of the abbreviated 2020 season due to injury, Álvarez became known for his slugging numbers and for being a clutch hitter. He won the 2021 ALCS MVP award, and in 2022, he hit the first walk-off home run in postseason history hit by a team down by multiple runs. He also hit a go-ahead home run in the 2022 World Series to secure his first championship.

Professional career

Cuban National Series 
Yordan Álvarez played two seasons in the Cuban National Series (CNS) for the Leñadores de Las Tunas.  In his second season, 2014–15, he batted .351, ranking second on the Leñadores, and hit one double and one home run over 40 games and 125 plate appearances.

Defection from Cuba 
Álvarez defected from Cuba, then established residency in Haiti in 2016.  While in Haiti, he met future Houston Astros teammate Yuli Gurriel and his brother, Lourdes Gurriel Jr., also a future major leaguer, and fellow Cubans.  Álvarez then travelled to West Palm Beach, Florida, where the Astros were building their spring training site, The Ballpark of the Palm Beaches.  He befriended Astros scout Charlie Gonzalez, who lobbied for club officials to sign Álvarez.  The club declined, however, having already incurred signing penalties from Gurriel's five-year, $47.5 million contract.  Álvarez signed with the Los Angeles Dodgers as an international free agent in June 2016 for $2 million.

Minor leagues
In August 2016, the Dodgers, in need of relief pitching, traded Álvarez to the Astros for Josh Fields, before he played a single game in the minors.  Dodgers President of Baseball Operations Andrew Friedman later acknowledged that trading Álvarez was "a mistake" and admitted "I obviously wish I would have said yes to other names [the Astros] asked for before him." (Friedman first believed that they wanted pitcher Yadier Álvarez).

Álvarez made his professional debut in 2016 with the Dominican Summer League Astros, where he spent the rest of year, batting .341 with a .974 OPS in 16 games.

Álvarez started 2017 with the Quad Cities River Bandits and was promoted to the Buies Creek Astros during the season. In 90 total games between the River Bandits and Astros, he batted .304/.379/.481 with 12 home runs and 69 RBIs in 335 at bats. He played in the 2017 All-Star Futures Game.

Álvarez was ranked among the top prospects in the minor leagues prior to the 2018 season. He started the 2018 season playing with the Corpus Christi Hooks of the Class AA Texas League. Despite being a right-handed thrower, Alvarez was incorrectly listed as a left-handed thrower by many websites prior to 2018 spring training. He split the 2018 season between Corpus Christi and the Fresno Grizzlies of the Class AAA Pacific Coast League, hitting a combined .293/.369/.534/.904 with 63 runs, 20 home runs and 74 RBIs in 335 at bats.

Álvarez opened the 2019 season with the Round Rock Express of the Pacific Coast League.  Prior to his first major league call-up, Álvarez batted .343/.443/.742 with 50 runs, 38 walks, 23 home runs, 71 RBIs, and an on-base plus slugging percentage (OPS) of 1.185 in 213 at bats with Round Rock.  He was leading the minor leagues in home runs, RBI and total bases (158), and was the Astros' #3 prospect and MLB.com's #23 overall prospect.

Houston Astros

2019
On June 9, 2019, the Astros selected Álvarez' contract and promoted him to make his major league debut that afternoon versus the Baltimore Orioles.  He went 1-for-3 with a two-run home run in his debut.  The following game, Álvarez again homered, this time versus Matt Albers of the Milwaukee Brewers.  He became the first Astro to homer in both of his first two games.  Álvarez became the fourth player in Major League Baseball (MLB) history to hit four home runs in his first five career games when he homered off of Clayton Richard of the Toronto Blue Jays, joining Trevor Story, Yasiel Puig and Mike Jacobs. On June 23, Álvarez hit a 2-run home run for his 7th home run of the season in only 12 games, establishing an Astros franchise record. He also became the first player in MLB history to drive in 16 runs in his first 12 games.  He won the American League (AL) Rookie of the Month Award for both June and July – the first Astro to do so – after garnering 48 hits, batting .336, 13 doubles, 13 homers and 39 RBI, .699 slugging, and 1.120 OPS.  He also led MLB with a 1.120 OPS since his debut, and was second in the AL with a .421 OBP, fourth in SLG, sixth in RBI, and seventh in average.  Thus, he emerged as a leading contender for AL Rookie of the Year honors despite his late start to the season.

On August 10, Álvarez hit a grand slam and homered twice more at Camden Yards for his first three-home run game in a 23–2 romp over the Orioles.  With a career-high seven runs driven in, his total stood at 51 to establish the major league record for the first 45 games.  The 23 runs accounted for a franchise record for runs scored in one game.  In a homestand at Minute Maid Park, Álvarez drove in six runs on three doubles in 21–1 outburst over the Seattle Mariners on September 8.  The following day, he hit home run numbers 23 and 24 in 15–0 win versus the Oakland Athletics to break Carlos Correa's franchise record for rookies, set in 2015.

In 2019, Álvarez batted .313/.412/.655 with 27 home runs and 75 RBIs in 313 at bats, and was the ninth-youngest ballplayer in the AL.  The unanimous winner of the AL Rookie of the Year Award, Álvarez' .655 slugging percentage (SLG) and 1.067 on-base plus slugging percentage (OPS) were both the highest in history for a qualified rookie, exceeding Shoeless Joe Jackson's 1.058 OPS during his 1911 rookie campaign (minimum 350 plate appearances).  Álvarez also led AL rookies in on-base percentage (OBP, .412) and extra base hits (53), and was second in HR and RBI.  Likewise, the Houston chapter of the Baseball Writers' Association of America (BBWAA) voted Álvarez as the Astros' Rookie of the Year.

Going into World Series play versus the Washington Nationals, Álvarez had endured a 1–22 performance versus the New York Yankees in his first American League Championship Series (ALCS).  In Game 5 of the World Series, he hit a two-run home run off Joe Ross a 7–1 Houston victory.  It was Álvarez' first career home run in both World Series and postseason play, and first home run since September 21.

2020
Álvarez sat out the beginning of the 2020 season after having tested positive for COVID-19.  He returned in August and played just two games before undergoing arthroscopic surgery on both of his knees, shutting him down for the rest of the season.

2021
On May 7, 2021, Álvarez drove in his 100th run, doing so in his 114th career game as part of a 10–4 win over the Toronto Blue Jays.  He was the seventh-fastest player to reach 100 RBIs in league history and the fastest to do so since the expansion era started in 1961.  The next game, he homered and drove in three more in an 8–4 loss to the Blue Jays for 103 RBIs in 115 games.

Álvarez hit his 30th home run of the season on September 13; at the age of 24, he was the second Astro to hit 30 home runs in a season at that age after Alex Bregman, who hit 31 in 2018.  On September 22, Álvarez drove in two runs on a home run in the first inning against the Los Angeles Angels to score his 100th RBI of the season.  He was the second-youngest Astro to reach 100 RBIs in one season, trailing César Cedeño, who did so at the age of 23 in 1974.

On the 2021 season, he batted .277/.346/.531 and led the Astros in home runs (33), RBIs (104), and strikeouts (145) and tied for the team lead in double plays grounded into (GIDP, 16) in 537 at bats.  He was named All-MLB Team Second Team at DH, his second career selection.

In Game 5 of the ALCS, the Astros faced Boston Red Sox pitcher Chris Sale at Fenway Park in a 9–1 win.  Álvarez logged three hits and three RBIs versus the left-handed ace, all to the opposite field, including one home run that cleared the Green Monster.  This marked the first occasion in Álvarez' career in which he had collected that many opposite-field hits, and first time facing Sale; meanwhile Sale had allowed four total hits to left-handed batters over his  innings in 2021.  The last left-handed batter to realize three hits in one game versus Sale was David Ortiz on July 30, 2015.  In Game 6, Álvarez collected four hits–including two doubles and one triple–as Houston prevailed, 5–0, the decisive game of the ALCS.  He hit .522, with a 1.408 OPS, three doubles, one triple, one home run, six RBIs, and seven runs scored.  His .522 average set a record for ALCS play, eclipsing Kevin Youkilis' .500 average hit in 2007, and he became the first player in MLB history to out-hit his entire opposing team over the final two games of a playoff series. For this, Álvarez was named ALCS Most Valuable Player (MVP), becoming the fourth Cuban-born player and the first designated hitter since Ortiz to win the award.  Álvarez did not carry his success into the World Series, in which he went 2-for-20 as the Astros lost to the Atlanta Braves in six games.

2022 
In a 6–1 win versus Washington at Nationals Park on May 13, 2022, Álvarez hit his 11th home run, helping to extend an Astros' winning streak to 11 games.  As it was his 27th appearance of the season, the home run established a new career best for fewest games to reach the total, surpassing 11 home runs in 30 games during his 2019 rookie season.  On June 2, 2022, Álvarez signed a six-year contract extension with the Astros worth $115 million; the deal bought out three remaining free-agent years that would keep him on the team until the 2028 season.  In the week ending June 5, he batted .565/.630/1.217 with two walks, four home runs, eight RBI, and one strikeout in six games.  He was named AL Player of the Week for the first time on June 6.  On June 29, Álvarez left the game versus the New York Mets.  He was carted off the field following an outfield collision with shortstop Jeremy Peña, both of whom were running for a Dominic Smith fly ball.

Álvarez won the AL Player of the Month Award for June, his first.  Over 23 games, he batted .418/.510/.835/1.346, garnering four doubles, one triple, nine home runs, and 28 RBI.  He led the league in batting, on-base percentage, slugging percentage, OPS and RBI, and ranked fourth the in the AL in home runs.  He posted an equal number of bases on balls and strikeouts (13).  Álvarez returned to play as DH versus Los Angeles after missing two games due to the collision with Peña, going 0-for-4 with a walk.  He hit his first career walk-off home run versus the Kansas City Royals on July 4, securing a 7–6 win.  On July 5, he hit his 25th home run and turned his first career double play, first catching a Nicky Lopez fly ball.  Álvarez then rifled the ball to Martín Maldonado at home plate on a  carom, who tagged out Hunter Dozier.

MLB announced Álvarez' selection on July 10 to the MLB All-Star Game at Dodger Stadium as a reserve DH, his first career selection.  He was leading the major leagues in OPS (1.058) and third in home runs (26) at the time.  The same day, however, the Astros placed him on the 10-day injured list due to right hand inflammation, ruling him out for the All-Star Game.  On July 21, the Astros activated Álvarez.  Álvarez hit his 30th home run on July 29 versus the Seattle Mariners to establish a team record for reaching the mark in the fewest appearances, doing so in his 84th game of the season.  On July 31, he delivered a walk-off RBI single in the tenth inning versus the Mariners to score José Altuve (3−2).

Over 77 August at bats, Álvarez produced a slugging percentage of .312.  Inflammation of the left hand kept Álvarez sidelined for five consecutive games until returning to the lineup on September 4.  He reached base four times versus the Angels on September 11, including his first home run in 88 plate appearances.  On September 16, Álvarez led the Astros to a 5–0 victory over the Oakland A's with a 4-hit performance, including three home runs in consecutive at bats off starter Adrián Martínez.  One each was hit in the first, third and fifth innings versus Martínez, making Álvarez the first Astro to hit three off one pitcher in the same game.  The 15th such game in franchise history, he became the third Astro to have hit two or more 3-HR games and first since Jeff Bagwell (two in 1999—3 total) and Glenn Davis (2).  The win also clinched a playoff berth for the Astros for a sixth consecutive season.  Álvarez earned the AL Player of the Week Award for the week ended September 18.  He totaled a .520 average (13-for-25), .556 OBP, 1.280 slugging percentage, 10 runs scored, 10 RBI, four doubles and five home runs.

In 2022, he batted .306/.406/.613, setting career-highs in home runs (37), runs scored (95) and bases on balls (78), and his slash line established career-bests.  In left field, Álvarez played a career-high 56 games, ranking second in the AL at his position in assists (7).  He produced a 187 adjusted OPS+, the second-highest in club history in a qualified season, trailing Bagwell's 213 OPS+ in the strike-shortened 1994 season.  Following the regular season, the Houston chapter of the BBWAA recognized Álvarez as the Astros' team Most Valuable Player (MVP).  He was one of seven nominees for the AL Hank Aaron Award.

On three occasions during the Astros' 2022 postseason run, Álvarez hit a home run in the sixth inning or later while his team was trailing that gave them the lead.  No other player had previously hit such a home run during postseason play more than once.  In Game 1 of the Division Series, Álvarez hit a three-run walk-off home run for an 8–7 triumph over the Mariners, the final of his three hits and five RBIs that day.  It was the first walk-off home run in an MLB postseason contest with the home team down to their final out in the ninth inning and trailing by more than one run,  With the Astros trailing 4–0 in the third inning, Álvarez doubled home two runs, and, in the fourth inning, rifled a throw home to home plate that put out Ty France and prevented a run from scoring.  Offensively, Álvarez' 1.054 win probability added (WPA, 105.4f%) surpassed David Freese's 2011 World Series walk-off home run game for highest ever in an MLB postseason contest.  Two days later, he hit a home run in the sixth inning to turn a 2–1 deficit into a 3–2 lead, which helped the Astros in a 4–2 victory as Alvarez became the second player with go-ahead home runs in the 6th inning or later of consecutive postseason games. Alvarez did not hit another home run for the rest of the series or the ALCS.  In the ALCS, the Astros won in four games, with Alvarez batting .214 with one RBI. In the World Series, he was kept off the basepaths for the most part, batting .130. However, he had an RBI in each of the four Astro victories. He had an RBI double to make it 2-0 in Game 2, was hit by a pitch with the bases loaded in Game 4, and hit a groundball to first to drive a runner home from third in Game 5. In the sixth inning of Game 6, with two runners on, he hit a 450-foot home run (his first in 23 days) to center field to make it a 3-1 game. The Astros won the game 4-1 to win their second World Series title in franchise history. Alvarez finished third in AL MVP voting, behind only Aaron Judge and Shohei Ohtani.

Personal life
Álvarez's parents are Agustín Eduardo Álvarez Salazar and Mailyn Cadogan Reyes. He also has a brother, Yonder Álvarez Cadogan.  It was during a contest at Minute Maid Park versus the Minnesota Twins on August 23, 2022, that his family first saw him play professionally since leaving Cuba.

Álvarez is Afro-Cuban.

Awards

See also

 Houston Astros award winners and league leaders
 List of baseball players who defected from Cuba
 List of Major League Baseball players from Cuba

References
Footnotes

Sources

External links

1997 births
Living people
People from Las Tunas (city)
Defecting Cuban baseball players
Major League Baseball players from Cuba
Cuban expatriate baseball players in the United States
Major League Baseball outfielders
Houston Astros players
Afro-Cuban
American League All-Stars
American League Championship Series MVPs
Major League Baseball Rookie of the Year Award winners
Silver Slugger Award winners
Leñadores de Las Tunas players
Dominican Summer League Astros players
Cuban expatriate baseball players in the Dominican Republic
Quad Cities River Bandits players
Buies Creek Astros players
Corpus Christi Hooks players
Fresno Grizzlies players
Round Rock Express players
Mesa Solar Sox players